Agia Varvara is a small village in the municipal unit of Akrata, Achaea, Greece.  In 2011 its population was 44 for the village and 66 for the community, including the village Vounaki.  It is built on the forested slopes of Mount Chelmos (Aroania). It is 3 km east of Mesorrougi, 15 km east of Kalavryta and 17 km south of Akrata. Between 1835 and 1912, Agia Varvara constituted a part of the municipality of Nonakrida, and between 1912 and 1996 it was an independent community.

Population

See also
List of settlements in Achaea

References

External links
Agia Varvara at the GTP Travel Pages

Aigialeia
Akrata
Populated places in Achaea